Route 104 is a  west–east highway in southeastern Massachusetts. Its western terminus is at U.S. Route 44 (US 44) in Taunton and its eastern terminus is at Route 106 in East Bridgewater.

Route description

Route 104 begins at U.S. Route 44 in Taunton. The highway crosses less than a thousand feet later thereafter into Raynham and passes through Raynham Center. The highway crosses over Interstate 495 without an interchange, enters Bridgewater, abuts the southern shore of Lake Nippenicket and intersects with Route 24, all within a space of about one mile (1.6 km). Route 104 then goes through the center of Bridgewater, intersecting with the northern end of the Route 18 and 28 concurrency in a three-route concurrency for a short distance which is signed as a rotary. Just east of the rotary is the location of Bridgewater State University, which Route 104 passes and grants entrance to.  It is at that same point where commuters may enter campus to gain access to the Bridgewater station of the MBTA's Middleborough-Lakeville commuter rail line. The highway then passes by the source of the Taunton River and ends at Route 106 in East Bridgewater astride the East Bridgewater/Bridgewater town line.

Major intersections

References

External links

104
Transportation in Bristol County, Massachusetts
Transportation in Plymouth County, Massachusetts